Keep the Fire Burnin' may refer to:

 "Keep the Fire Burnin'" (REO Speedwagon song), 1982
 "Keep the Fire Burnin'" (Dan Hartman song), 1994
 Keep the Fire Burnin' (album), an album  by Dan Hartman